Great Rollright is a village in the civil parish of Rollright, about  north of Chipping Norton, Oxfordshire.

Archaeology

Parish church
The Church of England parish church of Saint Andrew has Norman, Early English, Decorated Gothic and Perpendicular Gothic features. St Andrew's was restored in 1852 under the direction of the Oxford Diocesan Architect, GE Street. St Andrew's is a Grade I listed building.  The west tower has a ring of six bells. William Bagley of Chacombe, Northamptonshire cast the fourth, fifth and tenor bells in 1695 and the third bell in 1696. W&J Taylor cast the second bell in 1839, presumably at the foundry they then had at Oxford. Henry I Bond and Sons of Burford cast the treble bell in 1899.  St Andrew's parish is now part of the Benefice of Hook Norton with Great Rollright, Swerford and Wigginton.

On the 23 December 1944, a United States Army Air Force, Boeing B-17 Flying Fortress (43-38812) was on a flight from RAF Portreat to RAF Glatton. The aircraft crashed while descending in darkness & fog 2 miles North of Great Rollright, killing 8 of the 9 crew.

Economic and social history

The former Banbury and Cheltenham Direct Railway, part of the Great Western Railway, was completed in 1881. British Railways closed the halt in 1951 and the railway in 1964. The village has a former pub, The Unicorn Inn. It was controlled by Hunt Edmunds Brewery of Banbury until the company was taken over in the 1960s. The Unicorn ceased trading in the late 1980s and is currently derelict, but there is a campaign to restore it.

Amenities
Great Rollright has a Church of England primary school.  In 2010 Great Rollright also lost its Post Office and now has only a post office van service.

References

Sources

External links

"Rollright Review"

Villages in Oxfordshire
West Oxfordshire District
Aviation accidents and incidents locations in England